Victoria Forester is a Canadian author and a screenwriter. She is known for her novel, The Girl Who Could Fly.

Early life
Forester was born and grew up in a remote farm in Ontario, Canada. When she was 7 years old, she was passionate to be a nun, but resisted such a calling after watching Julie Andrews's The Sound of Music. As a child, Forester hoped to become "the sort of princess who solved international crimes" until she became interested in synchronized swimming and, later, writing.

She studied and graduated from the University of Toronto.

Career
After graduating, Forester's passion for storytelling led her to write and direct a short film for CBC. The Pony Tale was aired on Global Television and Forester moved to Los Angeles, California. Roger Corman, a famous independent film producer mentored her and gave the opportunity to write and later, direct her first feature film, Circuit Breaker, starring Richard Grieco and Corbin Bernsen.

Forester soon directed another film, Macon County Jail with David Carradine and Ally Sheedy, followed by a Disney Channel film, Cry of the White Wolf and Teen Scorcery, a story about mischievous teenage witches that was shot in Romania.

Novelist, The Girl Who Could Fly
Forester began writing The Girl Who Could Fly as a screenplay, which was optioned by Paramount Pictures. She loved the story so much she decided to write it as a novel.

Awards 
After publishing The Girl Who Could Fly, Forester won the Bank Street Best Children's Book of the Year, the Black Eyed Susan Award, Booklist Editors' Choice, Florida Sunshine State Young Readers Award Master List, Indiana Young Hoosier Award Master List and the Utah Beehive Book Award Master List Awards. The novel was under the Top 10 First Novels for Youth.

Personal life 
She is currently living in Los Angeles, California with her husband, daughter, and cat.

Publications
 The Girl Who Could Fly (2008, Reprinted on March 2010) 
 The Boy Who Knew Everything (2015)
The Girl Who Fell Out of the Sky (2020)

References

Living people
1974 births
Canadian fantasy writers
21st-century Canadian screenwriters
21st-century Canadian novelists
Canadian women film directors
Film directors from Ontario
Writers from Ontario
Canadian women screenwriters
Canadian women novelists
21st-century Canadian women writers